Spartimas is a genus of flies in the family Stratiomyidae.

Species
Spartimas apiciniger Zhang & Yang, 2010
Spartimas hainanensis Zhang & Yang, 2010
Spartimas ornatipes Enderlein, 1921

References

Stratiomyidae
Brachycera genera
Taxa named by Günther Enderlein
Diptera of Asia